The 1876 Birmingham by-election was fought on 27 June 1876.  The byelection was fought due to the resignation of the incumbent Liberal MP, George Dixon.  It was won by the Liberal candidate Joseph Chamberlain, who was unopposed.

References

1876 elections in the United Kingdom
1876 in England
19th century in Birmingham, West Midlands
June 1876 events
By-elections to the Parliament of the United Kingdom in Birmingham, West Midlands constituencies
Unopposed by-elections to the Parliament of the United Kingdom in English constituencies